Finland competed at the 1960 Winter Olympics in Squaw Valley, California, United States.

Medalists

Biathlon

Men

 1 Two minutes added per missed target.

Cross-country skiing

Men

Men's 4 × 10 km relay

Women

Women's 3 x 5 km relay

Ice hockey

Group B 
Top two teams (shaded ones) from each group advanced to the final round and played for 1st-6th places, other teams played in the consolation round.

USSR 8-4 Finland
Germany (UTG) 4-1 Finland

Consolation round 

Finland 14-1 Australia
Finland 6-6 Japan
Finland 19-2 Australia
Finland 11-2 Japan

Nordic combined 

Events:
 normal hill ski jumping 
 15 km cross-country skiing

Ski jumping

Speed skating

Men

Women

References
Official Olympic Reports
International Olympic Committee results database
 Olympic Winter Games 1960, full results by sports-reference.com

Nations at the 1960 Winter Olympics
1960
1960 in Finnish sport
Finnish-American culture in California